The Hamburg Huskies are an American football team in Hamburg, Germany. The club's greatest success came in 2014 when it won the northern division of the German Football League 2 and earned promotion to the German Football League.

History
The club was formed in 1994 as the Hamburg Wild Huskies. The club entered competitive football in 1995, won the tier four Oberliga and earned promotion to the Regionalliga. In 1998 the club earned promotion to the 2. Bundesliga, a league later renamed to GFL2. In reference to the Hamburg Silver Eagles, a club that went defunct shortly after the formation of the Huskies and provided many of its future players, the Wild Huskies were renamed Eagles in November 2003. Under this name the club won the northern division of the GFL2 for the first time in 2007. In the following promotion round to the GFL the Eagles lost both games to the Dresden Monarchs and missed out on promotion. Also in the 2007 season the team switched from its mother club SC Victoria Hamburg to the Harvesterhuder Tennis und Hockey Club (HTHC). In 2009 the club switched its name to the current Hamburg Huskies but also suffered relegation to the third division Regionalliga. After two seasons at this level the Huskies returned to the GFL2 from 2012 onwards.

After winning the northern division title of the GFL2 in 2014 the club qualified for the first time in its 20-year history for the GFL. It finished fourth in the northern division of the GFL and lost to the Schwäbisch Hall Unicorns in the quarter finals of the play-offs.

Honours
 GFL
 League membership: (4) 2015–2018
 Play-off qualification: (1) 2015
 GFL2
 Northern Division champions: 2007, 2014
 German Junior Bowl
 Runners-up: 2010

Recent seasons
Recent seasons of the Huskies:

 PR = Promotion round
 RR = Relegation round
 QF = Quarter finals

References

External links

  Official website
  German Football League official website
  Football History Historic American football tables from Germany

Huskies
German Football League teams
American football teams in Germany
American football teams established in 1994
1994 establishments in Germany